Somerville is an unincorporated community in Fauquier County, in the U.S. Commonwealth of Virginia.
Somerville, two miles (3 km) west of the remote southwest corner of Marine Corps Base Quantico, can be said to lie at the center of a  diamond-shaped area of mostly countryside bordered by routes US 15, 17, I-95, and SR 234. (These meet at Manassas to the north, Dumfries to the east, Fredericksburg to the south, and Warrenton to the west.) The tongue-in-cheek label "Downtown Somerville" appears on the front of the only retail establishment anywhere near the rural intersection of Midland Road and Bristersburg Road—Groves Store and Somerville Post Office. No other mailboxes lie within ZIP code 22739. No other occupied dwellings are in sight, and it is over six miles (10 km) to the nearest main road, US 17 at Morrisville. In its undated leaflet "Fauquier County Towns, Villages, and Communities", the Fauquier Historical Society says "[o]riginally Somerville was at Ensor's Shop but presently is nearby at what was once called White Ridge". That name survives today as White Ridge Farm. How and when this place was first called Somerville may be unknown, but family names are a common source of place names. Wikipedia says elsewhere that "Sir Gualtier de Somerville was one of William the Conqueror's knights... in 1066. The name most likely comes from 'Saint-Omer,' a town about 20 miles south of Dunkirk at the North of France." Almost eight centuries of this noble family's history were documented in a book edited by Sir Walter Scott in 1815. Over 100 Somerville family graves are known in Virginia. Although none has been identified in Somerville, almost half are in the adjacent county, Culpeper, dating from the 17th century through present times. A James Somerville, who died in 1798 and lies buried in the Masonic Cemetery at Fredericksburg, was born in Glasgow, Scotland, and was known locally as a landowner in Culpeper and Orange counties. His gravestone (recreated in 1970) identifies his nephew and heir as James Somerville, 1774–1858, the husband of Mary Atwell of Fauquier.

References

 

Unincorporated communities in Fauquier County, Virginia
Unincorporated communities in Virginia